Wang Shih-chieh also known as Wang Shijie (10 March 1891 – 21 April 1981) was a Chinese politician and scholar of the Kuomintang in service to the Republic of China. He signed the message of goodwill on behalf of the Government of China to the Constitutional Assembly of India at its inaugural meeting on the 9th of December 1946.

Early life and family origins 
Wang was born in 1891 in Chongyang County, Wuchang Prefecture, Hubei Province during the late Qing dynasty.

Biography 
Wang Shijie retreated with the Nationalists to Taiwan in 1949. After arriving in Taiwan, he remained active in politics including representing China before the UN General Assembly prior to 1972. He was president of Academia Sinica from 1962 to 1970. His daughter is Wang Chiu-Hwa.

References 

Members of the Kuomintang
People of the Chinese Civil War
Chinese anti-communists
1891 births
1981 deaths
Presidents of Wuhan University
Chinese Civil War refugees
Taiwanese people from Hubei
Ministers of Science and Technology of the Republic of China
Education Ministers of the Republic of China
Foreign Ministers of the Republic of China